The siege of Shouzhou was a two year long (955-957 AD) siege conducted by the Later Zhou dynasty against Shouzhou, the major fortress of the Southern Tang dynasty above the Yangtze River. The Later Zhou would eventually capture Shouzhou and destroy most Southern Tang armies in the process, severely crippling Southern Tang and ending its short time as one of China's major states. This siege was part of the Five Dynasties and Ten Kingdoms period of Chinese history.

Background 
With the collapse of the Tang Dynasty in the early part of the 10th century China became split between many states. The majority of the north was controlled by a single state, but that state saw frequent revolutions and changes of leadership. The south meanwhile was split between many feuding kingdoms. By 954 AD, the Later Zhou were the dynasty in the north while in the south the Southern Tang had conquered many of their neighbours and were the second to Later Zhou in power.

Prelude 
For once the north was internally stable and so Emperor Guo Rong (Zhou Shizong) of the Later Zhou gave his general Li Gu an army and commanded him to take Shouzhou, the main stronghold held by the Southern Tang north of the Yangtze. Li Gu managed to defeat the Southern Tang forces twice but was forced to withdraw when his lines of retreat were threatened. After this Guo Rong himself took over. He defeated a Southern Tang army and laid siege to Shouzhou.

Siege 
The Southern Tang again tried to threaten the Later Zhou's line of retreat but this time they were defeated. Details of the siege itself are slim, but we know many details of the campaigns of Southern Tang armies that were sent to relive the city in the two years the city was besieged. They were all defeated. All these Southern Tang armies were defeated without one gaining a major victory mainly due to Zhao Kuang Yin (future emperor Taizu of Song) who was the most talented commander of his time. Despite these victories the soldiers inside Shouzhou led by Liu Renzhan refused to surrender until all Southern Tang forces were defeated. This came in 957 AD when the last Southern Tang army north of the Yangtze was destroyed. The defenders then finally surrendered.

Aftermath 
With their armies gone and the main fort holding a major Zhou invasion of their territory also gone, the Southern Tang had to sue for peace. The peace gave Later Zhou all Southern Tang territory above the Yangtze and practically made Tang a vassal of Zhou. Zhao Kuang Yin used his popularity gained due to his many victories during the siege to overthrow Guo Rong's son in 960 AD, founding the Song Dynasty. With the Southern Tang severely weakened the Song were in good position to unify China, which they would 980 AD.

References

Later Zhou
Southern Tang
Yangtze River
10th century in China
Shouzhou
Shouzhou
zh:寿州之战